Doug and Bucky is a jazz guitar duet album of standards by Bucky Pizzarelli and Doug Jernigan, released June 27, 2006.

Track listing

 Honeysuckle Rose - 2:30 
 Talk of the Town - 4:30 
 Slow Burning - 3:13  
 The Days of Wine and Roses - 3:00 
 Limehouse Blues - 2:11 
 All the Things You Are - 2:24 
 The End of a Love Affair - 1:57 
 Sweet Lorraine - 2:30 
 'Round Midnight - 2:40 
 Moonlight in Vermont - 3:17

Personnel

Bucky Pizzarelli - guitar
Doug Jernigan - guitar

2006 albums